Hooked on You may refer to:

Film
Hooked on You (film), a 2007 Hong Kong comedy-drama film

Music
"Hooked on You" (song), a 1977 song by Bread
"Hooked on You", a song by Infinity, 2007
"Hooked on You", an unreleased song by Jennifer Lopez, intended for the album Love?, 2011
"Hooked on You", a song by Karyn White from the album Ritual of Love, 1991
"Hooked on You", a song by Rhett Fisher, 2017
"Hooked on You", a song by Silk from the album Silk, 1995
"Hooked on You", a song by Sweet Sensation from the album Take It While It's Hot, 1988
"Hooked on You", a song by Sydney Youngblood from the album Passion, Grace and Serious Bass..., 1991

Video Games
Hooked On You! A Dead by Daylight Dating Sim, a 2022 video game developed by Psyop in collaboration with Behaviour Interactive